Lori Klein is an American politician from Arizona. A Republican, she formerly served in the Arizona Senate, representing the state's 6th district. She is currently the Arizona Republican National Committeewoman.

Residence
Klein currently resides in Anthem, Arizona.

Legislative committee assignments
Klein was involved with the following committees:
 Appropriations, Member
 Economic Development and Jobs Creation, Member
 Education, Member
 Finance, Member
 Government Reform, Vice Chair

Professional experience
Klein has had the following professional experience:
 Owner, Lori Klein and Associates, present
 Development, The Health Care Freedom Act, present
 Director of Development, Medical Choice for Arizona (Proposition 101), 2008
 Executive Director, Medical Choice for Arizona (Proposition 101), 2008
 Executive Director, Proposition 207, 2006
 Spokesperson, Proposition 207, 2006
 National Director of Development, Americans for Fair Taxation, 2002–2006
 Executive Director, Taxpayer Protection Alliance, 1999–2000
 Director of Public Affairs, Arizona School Choice Trust, 1998
 Executive Director, Arizona School Choice Trust, 1998

Political experience

Klein ran in the 2012 election for Arizona House of Representatives District 1. She was defeated by incumbents Karen Fann and Andy Tobin in the Republican primary on August 28, 2012. The general election took place on November 6, 2012.

Redistricting moved Klein's home into the same district as Senate President Steve Pierce. Rather than face him, she decided to run in the Arizona House of Representatives. As a result, she lost the Republican primary to incumbents Andy Tobin and Karen Fann.

Klein ran in the 2010 election for Arizona State Senate District 6. She defeated incumbent Republican David Braswell in the August 24 primary by a margin of 10,846–8,324. Klein then defeated Pat Flickner in the November 2 general election.

Controversy 
Klein sparked a debate about Arizona's gun laws after allegedly demonstrating her .380 Ruger's laser sight by pointing it at the chest of a reporter during an interview.

References

External links

Living people
Republican Party Arizona state senators
Women state legislators in Arizona
Year of birth missing (living people)
21st-century American women